Aeschynomene is a genus of flowering plants in the family Fabaceae, and was recently assigned to the informal monophyletic Dalbergia clade of the Dalbergieae. They are known commonly as jointvetches. These legumes are most common in warm regions and many species are aquatic. The genus as currently circumscribed is paraphyletic and it has been suggested that the subgenus Ochopodium be elevated to a new genus within the Dalbergieae, though other changes will also be required to render the genus monophyletic.

Species
Aeschynomene comprises the following species:

 Aeschynomene abyssinica (A. Rich.) Vatke
 Aeschynomene acapulcensis Rose

 Aeschynomene acutangula Baker
 Aeschynomene afraspera J. Léonard
 Aeschynomene americana L.—shyleaf
 var. americana L.
 var. flabellata Rudd
 var. glandulosa (Poir.) Rudd
 Aeschynomene amorphoides (S. Watson) Robinson
 Aeschynomene angolense Rossberg
 Aeschynomene aphylla Wild

 Aeschynomene aspera L.—sola, sola pith plant, laugauni

 Aeschynomene batekensis Troch. & Koechlin
 Aeschynomene baumii Harms
 Aeschynomene bella Harms

 Aeschynomene benguellensis Torre

 Aeschynomene bracteosa Baker
 Aeschynomene bradei Rudd
 Aeschynomene brasiliana (Poir.) DC.
 Aeschynomene brevifolia Poir.
 Aeschynomene brevipes Benth.
 Aeschynomene bullockii J. Léonard
 Aeschynomene burttii Baker f.

 Aeschynomene carvalhoi G.P. Lewis

 Aeschynomene chimanimaniensis Verdc.
 Aeschynomene ciliata Vogel

 Aeschynomene compacta Rose

 Aeschynomene crassicaulis Harms
 Aeschynomene cristata Vatke—Malagasy jointvetch
 var. cristata Vatke
 var. pubescens J. León
 Aeschynomene curtisiae Johnston
 Aeschynomene deamii Robinson & Bartlett
 Aeschynomene debilis Baker

 Aeschynomene deightonii Hepper

 Aeschynomene denticulata Rudd

 Aeschynomene dimidiata Baker

 Aeschynomene egena (J.F. Macbr.) Rudd
 Aeschynomene elaphroxylon (Guill. & Perr.) Taub.—ambatch
 Aeschynomene elegans Cham. & Schltdl.

 Aeschynomene evenia C. Wright—shrubby jointvetch
 var. evenia C. Wright
 var. serrulata Rudd
 Aeschynomene falcata (Poir.) DC.—Australian jointvetch
 Aeschynomene fascicularis Cham. & Schltdl.

 Aeschynomene filosa Benth.

 Aeschynomene fluitans Peter
 Aeschynomene fluminensis Vell.
 Aeschynomene foliolosa Rudd

 Aeschynomene fulgida Baker

 Aeschynomene gazensis Baker f.
 Aeschynomene genistoides (Taub.) Rudd

 Aeschynomene glabrescens Baker

 Aeschynomene glauca R.E. Fr.

 Aeschynomene goetzei Harms
 Aeschynomene gracilipes Taub.
 Aeschynomene gracilis Vogel—Puerto Rico jointvetch

 Aeschynomene grandistipulata Harms

 Aeschynomene guatemalensis (Standl. & Steyerm.) Rudd

 Aeschynomene heurckeana Baker
 Aeschynomene hintonii Sandwith

 Aeschynomene histrix Poir.—porcupine jointvetch
 var. densiflora (Benth.) Rudd
 var. histrix Poir.
 var. incana (Vogel) Benth.

 Aeschynomene indica L.—Indian jointvetch
 Aeschynomene interrupta Benth.
 Aeschynomene inyangensis Wild

 Aeschynomene katangensis De Wild.
 Aeschynomene kerstingii Harms

 Aeschynomene langlassei Rudd
 Aeschynomene latericola Verdc.
 Aeschynomene lateritia Harms

 Aeschynomene laxiflora Baker

 Aeschynomene leptophylla Harms
 Aeschynomene leptostachya Benth.

 Aeschynomene lorentziana Bacigalupo & Vanni
 Aeschynomene lyonnetii Rudd

 Aeschynomene magna Rudd
 Aeschynomene marginata Benth.
 Aeschynomene martii Benth.
 Aeschynomene maximistipulata Torre

 Aeschynomene mediocris Verdc.
 Aeschynomene megalophylla Harms

 Aeschynomene micranthos (Poir.) DC.
 Aeschynomene mimosifolia Vatke

 Aeschynomene minutiflora Taub.
 Aeschynomene mollicula Kunth
 var. breviflora Rudd
 var. mollicula Kunth

 Aeschynomene monteiroi Alf. Fern. & P. Bezerra
 Aeschynomene montevidensis Vogel
 Aeschynomene mossambicensis Verdc.
 Aeschynomene mossoensis J. Léonard

 Aeschynomene multicaulis Harms
 Aeschynomene nana Rudd

 Aeschynomene neglecta Hepper
 Aeschynomene nematopoda Harms
 Aeschynomene nicaraguensis (Oerst.) Standl.

 Aeschynomene nilotica Taub.
 Aeschynomene nivea Brandegee
 Aeschynomene nodulosa (Baker) Baker f.
 var. glabrescens J. B. Gillett
 var. nodulosa (Baker) Baker f.
 Aeschynomene nyassana Taub.
 Aeschynomene nyikensis Baker

 Aeschynomene oligophylla Harms

 Aeschynomene oroboides Benth.
 Aeschynomene palmeri Rose

 Aeschynomene paniculata Willd. ex Vogel—pannicle jointvetch

 Aeschynomene paraguayensis Rudd
 Aeschynomene pararubrofarinacea J. Léonard
 Aeschynomene parviflora Micheli
 Aeschynomene patula Poir.

 Aeschynomene paucifolia Vogel
 Aeschynomene paucifoliolata Micheli

 Aeschynomene petraea Robinson
 Aeschynomene pfundii Taub.

 Aeschynomene pinetorum Brandegee

 Aeschynomene pleuronervia DC.
 Aeschynomene pluriarticulata G. Don
 Aeschynomene podocarpa Vogel
 Aeschynomene portoricensis Urb.
 Aeschynomene pratensis Small—meadow jointvetch
 var. caribaea Rudd
 var. pratensis Small
 Aeschynomene pringlei Rose

 Aeschynomene pseudoglabrescens Verdc.

 Aeschynomene pulchella Baker

 Aeschynomene purpusii Brandegee
 Aeschynomene pygmaea Baker

 Aeschynomene racemosa Vogel
 Aeschynomene rehmannii Schinz
 var. leptobotrya (Harms ex Baker f.) J. B. Gillett
 var. rehmannii Schinz

 Aeschynomene rhodesiaca Harms

 Aeschynomene riedeliana Taub.
 Aeschynomene rivularis Frapp.

 Aeschynomene rosei C.V. Morton
 Aeschynomene rostrata Benth.

 Aeschynomene rubrofarinacea (Taub.) F. White
 Aeschynomene rubroviolacea J. Léonard
 Aeschynomene rudis Benth.—zigzag jointvetch
 Aeschynomene ruspoliana Harms
 Aeschynomene sansibarica Taub.
 Aeschynomene scabra G. Don
 Aeschynomene schimperi A. Rich.
 Aeschynomene schindleri R. Vig.

 Aeschynomene schliebenii Harms
 var. mossambicensis (Baker f.) Verdc.
 var. schliebenii Harms

 Aeschynomene scoparia Kunth
 Aeschynomene selloi Vogel
 Aeschynomene semilunaris Hutch.
 Aeschynomene sensitiva Sw.—sensitive jointvetch

 Aeschynomene siifolia Baker
 Aeschynomene simulans Rose
 Aeschynomene solitariiflora J. Léonard
 Aeschynomene sparsiflora Baker

 Aeschynomene standleyi A.R. Molina

 Aeschynomene stipitata Burtt Davy
 Aeschynomene stipulosa Verdc.
 Aeschynomene stolzii Harms

 Aeschynomene tambacoundensis Berhaut

 Aeschynomene tenuirama Baker
 Aeschynomene tenuis Griseb.

 Aeschynomene trigonocarpa Baker f.
 Aeschynomene tsaratanensis Du Puy & Labat

 Aeschynomene tumbezensis J.F. Macbr.

 Aeschynomene uniflora E. Mey.
 Aeschynomene unijuga (M.E. Jones) Rudd
 Aeschynomene upembensis J. Léonard
 Aeschynomene venulosa Verdc.
 Aeschynomene vigil Brandegee
 Aeschynomene villosa Poir.
 var. longifolia (Micheli) Rudd
 var. mexicana (Hemsl. & Rose) Rudd
 var. villosa Poir.

 Aeschynomene virginica (L.) Britton & al.—Virginia jointvetch
 Aeschynomene viscidula Michx.
 Aeschynomene vogelii Rudd

 Aeschynomene warmingii Micheli
 Aeschynomene weberbaueri Ulbr.

References

External links
Jepson Manual Treatment
USDA Plants Profile

 
Fabaceae genera